General elections were held in Sweden on 18 September 1994. The Swedish Social Democratic Party remained the largest party in the Riksdag, winning 161 of the 349 seats. Led by Ingvar Carlsson, the party returned to power and formed a minority government after the election. This was the final time the Social Democrats recorded 45% of the vote before the party's vote share steeply declined four years later and never recovered. The Greens also returned to the Riksdag after a three-year absence.

The election saw the largest bloc differences for a generation, with the red-green parties making sizeable inroads into the blue heartlands of inner Småland and Western Götaland, at an even higher rate than 1988. The Social Democrats gathered more than 50% of the vote in all five northern counties, Blekinge, Södermanland, Västmanland and Örebro.

In spite of the loss of power, the Moderates retained their 80 seats and gained 0.5% from 1991. Due to the sizeable losses of their coalition, the net difference between the blocs was 53, with the red-greens making up 201 and the blue parties 148.

The Christian Democrats fared poorly, merely beating the threshold by 3,752 votes. New Democracy, a right-wing populist political party which had entered the Riksdag three years earlier, performed poorly, losing most of its voters and all of its seats in the Riksdag. In total the party's vote share dropped from 6.7% in 1991 to 1.2% in 1994. The election introduced an extended electoral cycle of four years, replacing the previous three-year terms.

It was also notable for being the first electoral event in the world whose official results were published live on the nascent World Wide Web (other countries had previously used the then-fledgling Internet to officially broadcast election results, but with simpler methods such as e-mail lists).

Results

Seat distribution

By municipality

References

General elections in Sweden
Sweden
General
Sweden